Stefan Lampadius (born November 17, 1976) is a German actor and filmmaker.

Biography 
Stefan Lampadius was born in Aurich in 1976 and grew up in Emden. One of his first film works was live video footage of the English post-punk band And Also The Trees, which he recorded. The material was released in 1998 on their commercial video Live 89-98.

From 2003 to 2010 Lampadius studied audio-visual material at the Academy of Media Arts Cologne. In 2010 he finished his study with diploma. He made some short films and began increasingly to work as film- and Television actor. He became known to a wider audience in Germany thanks to his role as co-worker Steffen Lambert in the well-known and award-winning TV series Stromberg, in which he participated since the second season in 2005.

Stefan Lampadius made his International film debut in the anthology movie Hives, in which he played the German engineer Ralf. The movie had its international premiere at the 60th San Sebastián International Film Festival (Spain).

Filmography (selection) 
 1998: And Also The Trees – Live 89-98 (Video album), (cinematography)
 2001: The Life of C. Brunner (Das Leben des C. Brunner), (short film), (screenwriter, producer, actor)
 2003: The Troublemaker (Der Ärgermacher), (actor,  directed by Steffen Jürgens)
 2005: Max und Moritz Reloaded (actor, directed by Thomas Frydetzki and Annette Stefan)
 2005: Der Ärgermacher-DVD, (co-producer, creative producer)
 2006: Axel! will’s wissen (TV series), (actor, directed by Patrick Winczewski)
 2006: Zores (TV movie), (actor, directed by Anja Jacobs)
 2007: Blind Flight (Blindflug), (actor, directed by Ben von Grafenstein)
 2007: Alles was zählt (TV series), (actor, directed by Jurij Neumann)
 2008: In Between Days (Die Besucherin), (actor, directed by Lola Randl)
 2009: Résiste - Aufstand der Praktikanten (actor, directed by Jonas Grosch)
 2009: The Two Lives of Daniel Shore (Die zwei Leben des Daniel Shore), actor, directed by Michael Dreher)
 2010: Zeche is nich – Sieben Blicke auf das Ruhrgebiet 2010 (TV movie), (actor, directed by Corinna Liedtke)
 2010: Thomas, Thomas, (actor, directed by Corinna Liedtke)
 2011: Seventh Day (Siebter Tag) (TV movie), (actor, directed by David Voss)
 2011: Alive and Ticking (Ein Tick anders), (actor, directed by Andi Rogenhagen)
 2011: Someone like him (Einer wie Bruno), (actor, directed by Anja Jacobs)
 2012: Stromberg (TV series), (actor, appearance in 38 episodes from 2005 to 2012, directed by Arne Feldhusen)
 2012: Idiotentest (TV movie), (actor, directed by Thomas Nennstiel)
 2012: MEK8 – Explodiert, Part 1 (TV series), (actor, directed by Nico Zavelberg)
 2012: The Spectator (Der Zuschauer), (experimental film), actor, directed by Christian Fischer) 
 2012: Hives (Košnice), (actor, directed by Simon Dolensky, Michael Lennox, etc.)
 2012: Keep Up the Good Work (Frohes Schaffen – Ein Film zur Senkung der Arbeitsmoral), (actor, directed by Konstantin Faigle)
 2013: Trimbelten (short film), (actor, assistant director, directed by Sebastian Kühn)
 2013: Wilsberg - Die Entführung, (actor, directed by Dominic Müller)
 2013: The Invention of Love (Die Erfindung der Liebe), (actor, directed by Lola Randl)
 2013: 00 Schneider – Im Wendekreis der Eidechse, (actor, directed by Helge Schneider)
 2013: West, (actor, directed by Christian Schwochow)
 2014: Stromberg - Der Film, (actor, directed by Arne Feldhusen)
 2014: The last cop (Der letzte Bulle) (TV series), (actor, appearance in 3 episodes from 2012 to 2014, directed by Thomas Nennstiel and Michael Kreindl)
 2014: Danni Lowinski (TV series), (actor, appearance in 2 episodes in 2012 and in 2014, directed by )
 2015: Ein starkes Team (TV series), (actor, directed by Thorsten Schmidt)
 2015: Our Father (Vaterunser), (actor, directed by Sascha Syndicus)
 2015: 3 Türken & ein Baby, (actor directed by Sinan Akkuş)
 2016: Bittersweet (Bittersüß), (actor, directed by Krishna Ashu Bhati)
 2017: Rocket Perelman (Rakete Perelman), (actor, directed by Oliver Alaluukas)
 2017: Painters at work (Die Maler kommen), (actor, produced, written and directed by Stefan Lampadius)
 2017: Club der roten Bänder - Die Liste, (TV series), (actor, directed by Felix Binder)
 2018: Alarm für Cobra 11 – Die Autobahnpolizei - Kein Entkommen, (TV series), (actor, directed by Franco Tozza)
 2019: We Are the Wave (web television series), (actor, appearance in 3 episodes, directed by Anca Miruna Lăzărescu)

Awards and nominations 
 2001: Special prize of the nordmedia – Film- und Mediengesellschaft Niedersachsen/Bremen mbH (North German film subsidy) for the film The Life of C. Brunner at the up-and-coming Int. Film Festival Hannover.
 2011: Team-Work-Award for Thomas, Thomas at the Stuttgarter Filmwinter Festival for expanded media
2017: Nomination for Painters at work in the category Best Feature Film at 27th Bamberg Short Film Days
2017: Nomination for the Jury-Award in the category German Competition for Painters at work at the 33rd Hamburg International Short Film Festival
2017: Audience award for Painters at work at the 11th Short Film Festival Cologne (KFFK)
2018: Nomination for Painters at work in the category Best Short Film at the 21st Motovun Film Festival

References

External links 
 

1976 births
Living people
German male film actors
German male television actors
People from Aurich
People from Emden
Mass media people from Lower Saxony
21st-century German male actors